The Creativity Research Journal is a quarterly peer-reviewed academic journal that covers research into all aspects of creativity. The editor-in-chief is Adam Green (neuroscientist) (Georgetown University). The journal was established in 1988 and is published by Taylor & Francis.

Abstracting and indexing
The journal is abstracted and indexed in:
Current Contents/Social & Behavioral Sciences
EBSCO databases
Ovid databases
ProQuest databases
Scopus
Social Sciences Citation Index
According to the Journal Citation Reports, the journal has a 2020 impact factor of 2.371.

References

External links

Publications established in 1988
Routledge academic journals
English-language journals
Creativity journals
Quarterly journals